Full Metal Village is a 2006 documentary film about the lives of the residents of a small village in the German state of Schleswig-Holstein, Wacken, in a series of interviews and visual tableaux as it prepares for the annual Wacken Open Air Festival. Taglined "Ein Heimatfilm", the director Cho Sung-Hyung explores the relationship of the 1,800 resident townsfolk and the brief annual influx of 70,000 metal music enthusiasts who attend the open-air concert.

Notable scenes of the film are elderly villagers who confess to have 'heard' that the concert-goers worship Satan, and over-enthusiastic concert-goers headbanging to the traditional regional anthem played by a local fire department band to open the festival.

Awards
The film has so far garnered all three awards for which it has been nominated: the 2007 Best Documentary at the Guild of German Art House Cinemas, the 2006 Best Documentary at the Hessian Film Award (prior to the film's theatrical release) and the 2007 Max Ophüls Award at the Max Ophüls Festival.

References

External links
 
 

German documentary films
2006 films
2000s German-language films
2006 documentary films
Documentary films about heavy metal music and musicians
2000s German films